The House of Hospitality is a building located at San Diego's Balboa Park, in the U.S. state of California. It was originally built for the Panama–California Exposition (1915) as the Foreign Arts Building.

Intended to be temporary, and was changed to the House of Hospitality for the California Pacific International Exposition (1935). The building was demolished in the 1990s for structural reasons and later reconstructed using the original building as a model. It is currently home to the Balboa Park Visitor's Center, the offices of the Balboa Park Conservancy, and offices for organizations operating in the park.

See also
 El Prado Complex
 Woman of Tehuantepec

References

External links
 

Balboa Park (San Diego)
Buildings and structures in San Diego